KF Fortuna 1975 (FK Fortuna Skopje) is a football club based in the Čento neighbourhood of Skopje, North Macedonia. They are currently competing in the Macedonian Third League (North Division).

History
The club was founded in 1975.

References

External links
Fortuna Skopje Facebook 
Club info at MacedonianFootball 
Football Federation of Macedonia 

Fortuna
Association football clubs established in 1975
1975 establishments in the Socialist Republic of Macedonia
Fortuna